Abdullahpur may refer to:

 Yamunanagar previously known as Abdullahpur, Haryana, India 
 Abdullahpur, Faisalabad, Punjab, Pakistan
 Abdullahpur, Jhelum, Punjab, Pakistan
 Abdullahpur Flyover, overpass in Faisalabad, Pakistan
 Abdullahpur Mori, Ghaziabad District, Uttar Pradesh, India